The Oscar Pettiford Orchestra in Hi-Fi Volume Two (also referred to as O.P.'s Jazz Men) is an album by bassist/cellist and composer Oscar Pettiford that was recorded in 1957 and first issued on the ABC-Paramount label.

Reception

The Allmusic site awarded the album 4½ stars.

Track listing 
All compositions by Oscar Pettiford except where noted.
 "Now See How You Are" (Pettiford, Woody Harris) - 5:10 
 "Laura" (David Raksin, Johnny Mercer) - 3:40  
 "Aw! Come On" - 3:55 
 "I Remember Clifford" (Benny Golson) - 4:42  
 "Somewhere" (Ray Copeland) - 4:00   
 "Seabreeze" (Larry Douglas) - 2:54  
 "Little Niles" (Randy Weston) - 4:40

Note
Recorded in New York City on August 23, 1957 (tracks 1, 3 & 4). August 30, 1957 (tracks 2 & 5), and September 6, 1957 (tracks 6 & 7)

Personnel 
Oscar Pettiford - bass, cello
Ray Copeland, Kenny Dorham (tracks 6 & 7), Art Farmer (tracks 1-5) - trumpet
Al Grey - trombone
David Amram, Julius Watkins - French horn
Gigi Gryce - alto saxophone, arranger
Benny Golson - tenor saxophone, arranger
Jerome Richardson - tenor saxophone, flute
Sahib Shihab - baritone saxophone
Betty Glamann - harp (tracks 2, 4, 6 & 7)
Dick Katz - piano
Gus Johnson- drums

References 

Oscar Pettiford albums
1958 albums
ABC Records albums
Impulse! Records albums
Albums produced by Creed Taylor